The men's coxed pair competition at the 2017 World Rowing Championships in Sarasota took place in Nathan Benderson Park.

Schedule
The schedule was as follows:

All times are Eastern Daylight Time (UTC-4)

Results

Heats
Heat winners advanced directly to the final. The remaining boats were sent to the repechage.

Heat 1

Heat 2

Repechage
The four fastest boats advanced to the final. The remaining boat took no further part in the competition.

Final
The final determined the rankings.

References

2017 World Rowing Championships